Edward Manning Ruttenber, usually published as E. M. Ruttenber (July 17, 1825 – Dec. 5, 1907) was an American historian who wrote History of the Indian Tribes of Hudson's River and other histories of the Hudson River Valley.

Works
 History of the Indian Tribes of Hudson's River. Albany: J. Munsell, 1872.
 Footprints of the red men. Indian geographical names in the valley of Hudson's river, the valley of the Mohawk, and on the Delaware: their location and the probable meaning of some of them. Newburgh Journal Print, 1906.

Footnotes

External links

 
 

1825 births
1907 deaths
19th-century American historians
19th-century American male writers
Historians of Colonial North America
Historians of the United States
American non-fiction writers
American male non-fiction writers